The Cycling Podcast is an independent sports audio production created by Richard Moore, Lionel Birnie, and Daniel Friebe. Launched in 2013, weekly, hour-long episodes provide insight, analysis and often irreverent take on professional road cycling. Each episode features interviews with different professional cyclists, team staff and other actors from across the sport. Increased coverage is provided at the Grand Tours (the Giro d'Italia, Tour de France and Vuelta a España) where daily episodes are recorded at the end of each stage. It is also published by the UK broadsheet newspaper, The Telegraph.

The Cycling Podcast Series

 Kilometre 0 by The Cycling Podcast is a recurring series produced at each of the three Grand Tours. The series takes listeners behind the scenes, bringing them the stories from beyond the racing. Previous topics include the gastronomic culture, politics and sustainability. The title, Kilometre 0, is the official start of a bike race which arrives after the "départ fictif" or neutralized start.
 The Cycling Podcast Féminin is a monthly magazine show covering women's professional road cycling and the UCI Women's World Tour. It is presented by Richard Moore with Orla Chennaoui and Rose Manley.
 Explore by The Cycling Podcast, a six part series that premiered in 2018. It examines the emerging trends of bikepacking, endurance and ultra-endurance cycling. It is set to return in March 2020. It is led by Lionel Birnie with Hannah Troop and Tom Whalley.
 Adam Blythe Interviews... by The Cycling Podcast is a six-part series, launched in spring 2019. In each episode, Lotto-Soudal rider Adam Blythe interviews a significant figure from the world of professional cycling.
 Service Course by The Cycling Podcast, introduced in 2019 is Tom Whalley and Lizzy Banks' show looking at the world of bikes, technology and equipment.
  Life in the Peloton  An existing popular podcast that was hosted under the umbrella of The Cycling Podcast for 1 season, presenting by the EF Education First pro cyclist Mitch Docker. Mitch is joined by Lionel Birnie for a short discussion before and after Docker’s podcast to discuss and reflect on the talking points of the episode. Mitch typically interviews unique and interesting characters in the world of professional cycling. Notable guests include Svein Tuft, Luke Durbridge, Mike Woods, Adam Hansen, Paul de Geyter (cycling agent) and Phil Liggett (commentator and known as “the voice of cycling”).

History 

The Cycling Podcast began as short audio dispatches from the 2013 Tour de France supported by sponsorship from Sharp. 
Listener numbers hit 9,000 halfway into the race which helped secure funding from Jaguar for the following year. In 2015, audience numbers grew to 30,000 and partnerships were developed with The Telegraph and Eurosport. Support from sports nutrition brand Science in Sport saw The Cycling Podcast cover their first Giro d'Italia in 2016 and title sponsorship from cycling lifestyle brand Rapha, secured the future of the podcast for the following two years. Notably, The Cycling Podcast was referenced in the House of Commons Culture, Media and Sport Select Committee's report into Combatting doping in sport.

The Cycling Podcast was the first podcast ever to be accredited to the Tour de France.

The Cycling Podcast has been nominated for several awards since 2016. The podcast was given best podcast at the 2016 Cycling Media Awards. In 2018, The Cycling Podcast was a Bronze medalist in sports podcast category at the British Podcast Awards. It has been renominated in the Sports category in 2019. The Grand Tour Diaries, the second book by the team behind The Cycling Podcast was released in November 2019.

Beginning in 2018, Daniel Friebe became a member of ITV's cycling coverage team for the Tour de France and Vuelta a España, and started appearing on the podcast less frequently during those races, and often contributing in the way of a guest pundit. As ITV didn't typically cover the Giro d'Italia, he remained a key part of the team during the Italian Grand Tour. The Cycling Podcast was recorded live with an audience at the 2019 World Championships.

In early 2022, lead presenter Richard Moore died suddenly. In his absence, Birnie and Friebe were the main presenters during the Giro d'Italia, and during the Tour de France, the podcast was hosted by Birnie, François Thomazeau and recently retired cyclist Mitchell Docker.

Coverage

Giro d'Italia 

In 2016, The Cycling Podcast team covered the Giro d'Italia for the first time, thanks to new sponsorship funding from Science in Sport. Italian journalist Ciro Scognamiglio of La Gazzetta dello Sport is a regular contributor during the three-week stage race.

Tour de France 

The Cycling Podcast began as daily dispatches from the Tour de France in 2013. Richard Moore, Lionel Birnie and Daniel Friebe, along with a cast of special guests, have provided analysis and insight from each of the 21 stages of the race every year since. Esteemed French journalist and author François Thomazeau (winner of the 2015 Prix Jacques Goddet) has joined them in their coverage since 2017.

Vuelta a España 

Following the title sponsorship of cycling clothing brand Rapha, The Cycling Podcast added the third Grand Tour to their coverage in August 2016.

Contributors 

The Cycling Podcast features regular contributions from journalists François Thomazeau, Ciro Scognamiglio, Fran Reyes, Brian Nygaard and sports commentator Rob Hatch. The Service Course, a new tech show by The Cycling Podcast launched in 2019 with YouTube star Keira McVitty and radio producer Tom Whalley. McVitty was subsequently replaced by Lizzie Banks, a double Giro d’Italia stage winner.

Past contributors: Matthew Beaudin, Ned Boulting, John Bradley, Caley Fretz, Rupert Guinness, Andy Hood, Matt Rendell, Owen Rogers, Owen Slot, Anthony Tan, Hannah Troop and Moeen Islam (avid fan of the show).

Support and sponsorship 

As of 2020, The Cycling Podcast is sponsored by Supersapiens, having until the end of 2019 been sponsored by Rapha  and after that by iwoca,. It also receives support from Science in Sport. Past sponsors include Allpress Espresso, HumansInvent.com, Sharp, Van Dessel Cycles, British Eurosport, Nederburg Wines, Jaguar, Wellbrix and Hansgrohe showers and taps. The Telegraph is a long standing media partner of The Cycling Podcast.

References 

Audio podcasts
2013 establishments
2013 podcast debuts 
Sports podcasts 
British podcasts